Trouillot is a French surname. It may refer to:

Ertha Pascal-Trouillot (born 1943), provisional President of Haiti in 1990–91.
Evelyne Trouillot (born 1954), Haitian novelist
Georges Trouillot (1851–1916), French politician
Henock Trouillot (1923–88), Haitian historian, playwright, and novelist
Jocelyne Trouillot (born 1948), Haitian writer and educator
Lyonel Trouillot (born 1956), Haitian novelist and poet
Michel-Rolph Trouillot (1949-2012), Haitian academic and anthropologist
Mildred Trouillot (born 1963), American lawyer and wife of Jean-Bertrand Aristide, former President of Haïti